Suddenly is a 1996 American drama television film starring Kirstie Alley and Jason Beghe. Directed by Robert Allan Ackerman and written by David Kinghorn and Marilyn Kinghorn, it was first aired on ABC on December 1, 1996. It deals with some of the issues faced by paraplegic wheelchair users. Jason Bernard appears posthumously in the film.

Plot 
Marty Doyle is a hard-working waitress. Despite her wisecracking and positive demeanor, she feels her life is pretty empty, with only one plus point; a new relationship.

One day, her life is turned upside down when she is knocked down by a car. In that instant, Marty loses the use of her legs and her sense of self-worth, and, soon after, she loses her boyfriend.
Though she attempts to get on with life, her efforts are dealt a massive blow when she is mugged. Feeling utterly despondent and depressed, Marty starts to feel sorry for herself and turns to alcohol.
Just when she’s at her lowest, she meets and befriends Joe Mulvey, a fellow paraplegic, who helps her cope with her new way of life.

Cast 
 Kirstie Alley as Marty Doyle
 Jason Beghe as Joe Mulvey
 Colleen Camp as Jude
 Nancy Cartwright as Dell
 David Crosby as Eddie
 David Beecroft as Doug
 Michael Paul Chan as Mr. Chow
 Anthony Russell as Willie
 Jason Bernard as Louie
 Shaun Toub as Mr. Tabibisdan
  W. W. Wilson as Cabbie Paulie
 Alice Lo as Mrs. Chow
 Charles Noland as Cabbie Mike
Manny Perry as Bus Driver
 Don Keith Opper as Barney

Production
The film was previously titled An Urban Legend and When Somebody Loves You. Filming took place in San Pedro, Los Angeles.

References

External links 
 

1996 drama films
1996 films
1990s American films
1990s English-language films
ABC network original films
American drama television films
Films about paraplegics or quadriplegics
Films about road accidents and incidents
Films directed by Robert Allan Ackerman
Films scored by David Mansfield
Films shot in Los Angeles
Rysher Entertainment films